A teaching hospital is an institutional hospital responsible for providing medical training to students and graduate from medical school. They are usually affiliated with a university or medical school. There are various teaching hospitals scattered all over the country. The following is a list of teaching hospitals in Nigeria.

Lagos University Teaching hospital
University of Benin Teaching Hospital
Aminu Kano Teaching Hospital
Abia State University Teaching Hospital,
 Imo State University Teaching Hospital,
Olabisi Onabanjo University Teaching Hospital
Ahmadu Bello University Teaching Hospital
 University of Port Harcourt Teaching Hospital
 University of Uyo Teaching Hospital
 University College Hospital, Ibadan
 University of Calabar Teaching Hospital
 Usman Danfodio University Teaching Hospital
 University of Abuja Teaching Hospital
 Delta State University Teaching Hospital
Igbinedion University Teaching Hospital
 Irrua Specialist Teaching Hospital
University of Nigeria Teaching Hospital
Obafemi Awolowo University Teaching Hospital
Benue State University Teaching Hospital
Jos University Teaching Hospital
Niger Delta University Teaching Hospital
Nnamdi Azikiwe University Teaching Hospital

References

Teaching